is given to one sportsperson or sports team every year since 1968 by the Japan Professional Sports Association. The award is one of the most prestigious all-sport awards in Japanese sport. The recordholders are the baseball players Ichiro Suzuki and Sadaharu Oh (three awards). A committee of representatives from Tokyo newspapers, wire services, television and radio for sports media are responsible for making the selections. The winner is given the Prime Minister Trophy.

Since 2019 to 2021, the awards was discontinued due to problems within the Japan Professional Sports Association.

List of winners

Wins by sports

References

Japan Professional Sports Association 

Sport in Japan
National sportsperson-of-the-year trophies and awards
Awards established in 1968
1968 establishments in Japan
Japanese awards